Guilherme Henriques da Silva Carvalho (born 11 June 2003), known as Guilherme Smith, is a Brazilian professional football striker who plays for Braga on loan from Zorya Luhansk.

Club career

Early years
Guilherme Smith is a product of the Vasco da Gama, Fluminense and Botafogo academies, all from Rio de Janeiro, Brazil.

Zorya Luhansk
In June 2021 he signed a 3 years contract with the Ukrainian Premier League club Zorya Luhansk. He made his debut on 28 October 2021, played as a start-squad player in a winning away match against Rukh Lviv in the Round of 16 of the Ukrainian Cup.

References

External links
 Guilherme Smith at playmakerstats.com (English version of ogol.com.br)
 
 

2003 births
Living people
Brazilian footballers
Association football forwards
FC Zorya Luhansk players
Brazilian expatriate footballers
Expatriate footballers in Ukraine
Brazilian expatriate sportspeople in Ukraine
Expatriate footballers in Portugal
Brazilian expatriate sportspeople in Portugal
Brazil youth international footballers